Statistics of the V-League in the 1987-88 season.

1987

First round

27 participants divided over 3 groups playing double round robin;
top-4 of each to second phase

Second round

12 participants divided over 3 groups playing single round robin;
top-2 of each and 2 best 3rd place teams to quarterfinals

Quarterfinals
An Giang       1-1 Saigon Port    [4-2 pen]

Final
Cau Lac Bo Quan doi (Ha Noi)  1-0 Quang Nam (Da Nang)

1988

Overview
Season was cancelled, instead, regional friendship tournaments were held.

References

Vietnamese Super League seasons
1987 in Vietnamese football
1988 in Vietnamese football
Viet